Damien: Omen II is a 1978 supernatural horror film directed by Don Taylor and the second installment of The Omen series. It stars William Holden and Lee Grant, with Jonathan Scott-Taylor, Robert Foxworth, Lew Ayres, Sylvia Sidney, Lance Henriksen, Ian Hendry, and Leo McKern. Set seven years after the first film, it follows a now-pubescent Damien Thorn (Scott-Taylor) as he begins to realize his destiny as the Antichrist.

Franchise producer Harvey Bernhard wrote the screen story, with a screenplay by Stanley Mann and Mike Hodges. Hodges was the original director, but was fired and replaced by Don Taylor early in production. Unlike the first film, which was shot in England and Italy, filming of the sequel took place primarily in Chicago, Illinois; Wisconsin, and Israel.

It was released by 20th Century Fox on June 9, 1978, and received mixed reviews from critics. A sequel, Omen III: The Final Conflict, was released in 1981.

Plot 
A week after the funerals of Robert and Katherine Thorn, archaeologist Carl Bugenhagen learns that their adopted son Damien is still alive. Confiding to his friend Michael Morgan that Damien is the Antichrist, Bugenhagen wants him to give Damien's new guardian a box containing the means to kill Damien. As Morgan is unconvinced, Bugenhagen takes him to a local ruin to see the mural of Yigael's Wall, which was said to have been drawn by a monk who saw the Devil and had visions of the Antichrist as he would appear from birth to adulthood. Though Morgan believes him upon seeing an ancient depiction of the Antichrist with Damien's face, both he and Bugenhagen are trapped and buried alive as the tunnel collapses.

Seven years later, the 12-year-old Damien is living in Chicago with his uncle, industrialist Richard Thorn and his second wife, Ann. Damien gets along well with his cousin Mark, Richard's son from his first marriage, with whom Damien is enrolled in a military academy. However, Damien is despised by Richard's aunt, Marion, who sees him as a bad influence on Mark and demands that they be separated. Ann vehemently reacts and demands she leave. Aunt Marion threatens to rewrite her will, i.e. the allocation of her shares in the family business. She is found dead in her bed by Ann the following morning, an apparent heart attack after being visited by a raven, perched on her window sill, in the dead of night.

At Thorn Industries, manager Paul Buher suggests expanding the company's operations into agriculture; however, the project is shelved by senior manager Bill Atherton, who calls Buher's intention of buying up land in the process unethical. At Mark's birthday party, Buher introduces himself to Damien, invites him to see the plant, and also speaks of his approaching initiation. Buher seemingly makes up with Atherton, who drowns after falling through the ice at a hockey game on a lake the following day.

A photojournalist named Joan Hart, a friend of Thorn Museum curator Dr. Charles Warren, arrives in Chicago and attempts to interview Richard.  When she asks about his brother's involvement with Bugenhagen, Richard angrily ends the interview.  Having recently seen Yigael's Wall herself, Joan is horrified when she visits the academy and sees Damien in person. She drives away in a panic, but her car mysteriously stalls. The raven appears and attacks Joan by pecking out her eyes. She is killed by a semi-truck after wandering blindly into its path.

Meanwhile, at the academy, Damien's new commander, Sergeant Neff, is revealed to be a secret Satanist. Damien learns his true nature, and flees the Academy grounds. Later, Dr. David Pasarian is killed when he and his assistant suffocate from toxic fumes during an apparent industrial accident. The incident sickens Damien's class, who were visiting the plant at the time. Treated at hospital, only Damien is found to be unaffected by the fumes. A doctor suggests keeping him in the hospital as a precaution. The doctor discovers that Damien's marrow cells resemble those of a jackal but before he can investigate any further or report his findings he is killed by a falling elevator cable.

Meanwhile, Bugenhagen's box has been found during an excavation of the ruins and delivered to the Thorn Museum. Dr. Warren opens it and finds the Seven Daggers of Megiddo, the only weapons able to kill Damien, along with a letter by Bugenhagen explaining that Damien is the Antichrist. Warren rushes to inform Richard. Mark overhears their conversation and confronts Damien. Reluctantly, and then proudly, admitting to being the Devil's son, Damien pleads with Mark to join him on his rise to power, but Mark's steadfast refusal "forces" Damien to kill Mark by causing an aneurysm in his cousin's brain.

Shaken by his son's death, Richard goes to New York City to see a half-crazed Warren before being taken to the train station where Yigael's Wall is being stored in a cargo carrier. As he sees Damien's image, a switching locomotive impales Warren and crushes him against the carriage, destroying the wall and convincing Richard beyond doubt that Damien is the Antichrist. Upon his return, Richard has Damien picked up from his graduation at the academy while taking Ann to the museum. 

When they find the daggers in Warren's office in the Thorn Museum, Ann uses them to kill Richard, revealing herself to be a Satanist. She says "I've always belonged to him!", then screams "Damien!" Having heard the altercation from an outside corridor, Damien wills a nearby boiler room to explode, setting fire to the building and killing Ann. Damien leaves the burning museum and is picked up by the family driver, Murray, as the fire department arrives.

Cast

Development and pre-production

Writing 
David Seltzer, who wrote the first film's screenplay, was asked by the producers to write the second. Seltzer refused, for he had no interest in writing sequels. Years later he commented that if he had written the story for the second Omen, he would have set it the day after the first movie, with Damien a child living in the White House. With Seltzer turning down Omen II, producer Harvey Bernhard duly outlined the story himself, and Stanley Mann was hired to write the screenplay.

The earliest drafts presented Damien as a teenager and featured a female love interest. The love interest was deleted in the final film.

Casting 
Academy Award-winning veteran actor William Holden was considered to star as Robert Thorn in the first Omen, but turned it down as he did not want to star in a picture about the devil. Gregory Peck was selected as his replacement. The Omen went on to become a huge hit, and Holden made sure he did not turn down the part of protagonist Richard Thorn in the sequel. Lee Grant, another Oscar-winner, was a fan of the first Omen, and accepted enthusiastically the role of Ann Thorn.

Ray Berwick (1914–1990) trained and handled the crows used for several scenes in the film. Live birds and a crow-puppet were used for the attack on photojournalist Joan Hart. Berwick also trained the avian actors in Alfred Hitchcock's The Birds (1963).

Leo McKern reprises his role as Carl Bugenhagen from the original film. McKern is the only cast member of the series to appear as the same character in more than one installment, although actor Tommy Duggan appears in the first and third installments of the series as different characters.

Damien: Omen II was the film debut of Meshach Taylor (Dr. Kayne).

Production

Under Mike Hodges 
Richard Donner, director of the first Omen movie, was not available to direct the second; he was busy working on Superman. British director Mike Hodges was hired to helm the movie. Four weeks into principal photography, the producers fired Hodges, claiming his working methods were too slow and placing the film behind schedule. 

Harvey Bernhard cited a demonstrative instance where Hodges spent half a day's filming setting up a single shot of Damien arriving at the military academy in order to place a bonfire in the foreground. Hodges maintained a screenwriter's credit on the finished film.

In later interviews, Hodges commented sanguinely on his experiences working on Omen II.

Under Don Taylor 
Bernhard replaced Hodges with Don Taylor, who had a reputation for finishing films on time and under budget. Taylor reshot several of Hodges scenes, though several of the earlier director's takes remain in the final film, including:

 The entire opening sequence in Jerusalem.
 Some of the footage at the factory and at the military academy.
 The dinner where Aunt Marion shows her concern about Damien

Lance Henriksen expressed frustration that Taylor cut most of his role and character development. 

Taylor also added the twist ending of Ann Thorn being a secret disciple of Damien who kills Richard in the climax.

Filming locations 
Unlike the first film, which was shot primarily in England, Damien was filmed almost entirely in the United States.

The film was mainly set in Chicago and was largely filmed in that city's downtown. The Thorn Industries building was actually Chicago City Hall. Another scene took place at Graceland Cemetery. Scenes that were supposedly at a New York City railroad freight yard, with the CBOT Tower and the Sears Tower clearly visible in the background, were actually filmed at the Rock Island Railroad's 12th Street intermodel yard in Chicago, IL.

Other locations included Lake Forest Academy's campus, which was used as the Thorn Mansion, the Northwestern Military and Naval Academy's Lake Geneva, Wisconsin campus, which was used for the military academy, with real Lake Geneva students portraying most of the academy cadets, and the Murphy Estate on Catfish Lake in Eagle River, Wisconsin for the skating scene, with local children playing the skaters. The Field Museum of Natural History, depicting the Thorn Museum, was also used in several scenes throughout the film, including some of its final minutes.

The opening scenes were filmed in Acre, Israel, as well as the ruins of the crusader city Akko.

The interiors were shot at 20th Century Fox soundstages in Los Angeles.

Reception 
The film received mixed reviews, but was deemed as a worthy sequel. On review aggregator website Rotten Tomatoes, the film received an approval rating of 46% based on 26 reviews, with an average rating of 5.2/10. The site's consensus states: "Damien dishes out ghoulish scares and a Biblical body count to generate some morbid fun, but this repetitious sequel lacks the sophistication of its predecessor."

Vincent Canby of The New York Times wrote, "Perhaps my resistance has given out but Damien—Omen II, though it's as foolish as the first film, is rather more fun to watch and sometimes very stylish-looking." Variety wrote, "Damien is obviously wearing out his welcome, but presold interest and a couple of gruesome, ghastly death scenes should shore up business for the summer." Gene Siskel of the Chicago Tribune found it inferior to the original because "there's nothing particularly surprising or horrifying about a teen-ager in league with the devil. Also, the commotion the kid inspires this time is not particularly frightening." Gary Arnold of The Washington Post wrote, "Far from advancing the unsavory premise of the first film, this one doggedly retraces its steps. The result is an inferior copy rather than a narrative continuation." Charles Champlin of the Los Angeles Times wrote, "For all its slavish copying of the original, 'Damien — Omen II' plays differently. It's a hoot instead of a scream. Its deaths are frequent and exceedingly graphic, but you wait for them as for the acts on a variety bill. The connective tissue is frailer this time, and there is almost no accumulation of suspense." Richard Combs of The Monthly Film Bulletin wrote, "The main trouble with the Evil One as a protagonist is that his opposition never looks very convincing—and like its predecessor, Omen II is based on a rather lame structure in which successive individuals discover something amiss about Damien and then meet an inexorably bloody end."

Box office 
The film opened at number one at the US box office with a gross of $3,880,880 in its opening weekend from 524 theaters. It went on to gross $26.5 million in the United States and Canada, generating theatrical rentals of $12.1 million. Worldwide, it earned rentals of $20.6 million compared to $46.3 million for the original.

Soundtrack 

After Harvey Bernhard had finished writing the story outline and was given the green light to start the production, the first person he contacted was Jerry Goldsmith because of the composer's busy schedule. Bernhard also felt that Goldsmith's music for The Omen was the highest point of that movie, and that without Goldsmith's music, the sequel would not be successful. 

Goldsmith's Omen II score uses similar motifs to his original Omen score, but for the most part he avoided re-using the same musical cues. In fact, the first movie's famous "Ave Satani" theme is reprised only partially, just before the closing credits begin. Goldsmith composed a largely different main title theme for Omen II, albeit one that utilises Latin phrases as "Ave Satani" had done. Goldsmith's Omen II score allows eerie choral effects and unusual electronic sound designs to take precedence over the piano and gothic chanting.

Unlike The Omen (and The Final Conflict), Jerry Goldsmith's score was recorded in the US, with the soundtrack album re-recorded in Britain for financial reasons. Lionel Newman conducted both the film and album versions; Varèse Sarabande later released an expanded CD including both, the liner notes of which explain the reasons behind the re-recording (a short-lived union rule meant that musicians had to be paid the full amount for the film and album use if the soundtrack was released on LP, doubling their fee. It was cheaper, therefore, to re-record in the UK than pay the orchestra double in the US). The liner notes also explain that some of the soundtrack's pieces have been re-written slightly or even merged for the album re-recording. The audio quality of these UK-recorded album tracks also sounds noticeably more dynamic. Some sections of the film's soundtrack – the tapes of which were thought lost for many years – were discovered to have warped in storage and have noticeable and uncorrectable flaws. (The film soundtrack is listed from track 11 onwards).

Home media 
The film was released on videocassette during the 1980s and 1990s. In 2000, it was part of The Omen Quadrilogy DVD set released in the US and UK, and was not available separately until 2005. In 2006, to coincide with the DVD release of the remake of the original film, The Omen and its sequels were released individually and together in an ultimate Pentalogy boxset digitally remastered and with more bonus features. In 2008, it was released on Blu-ray with its predecessor and 1981 sequel, Omen III: The Final Conflict. It is available as streaming video with a Cinemax subscription, alongside its predecessor, sequels and remake, all of which are downloadable through Amazon, Apple's iTunes and Vudu; it is also available alongside The Final Conflict for streaming on Disney+ via the international brand Star.

References

External links 

 
 
 
 
 interview with Mike Hodges

The Omen (franchise)
1978 films
1978 horror films
1970s mystery films
1970s supernatural films
20th Century Fox films
American sequel films
American supernatural horror films
American mystery films
British horror films
1970s English-language films
Fictional depictions of the Antichrist
The Devil in film
Films about Satanism
Films about telekinesis
Films scored by Jerry Goldsmith
Films directed by Don Taylor
Films set in Chicago
Films shot in Chicago
Lake Forest Academy
Films set in Israel
Films shot in Israel
Films with screenplays by Stanley Mann
1970s American films
1970s British films